Gregory Mark Cox (born January 6, 1965) is a former professional American football safety in the National Football League. He played college football for the San Jose State Spartans. He played four seasons for the San Francisco 49ers (1988, 1990–1991) and the New York Giants (1989).

References

1965 births
Living people
Sportspeople from Niagara Falls, New York
Players of American football from Columbus, Ohio
American football safeties
San Jose State Spartans football players
San Francisco 49ers players
New York Giants players